WCSN can refer to:

 WCSN-FM, a radio station (105.7 FM) in Orange Beach, Alabama, United States
 WCSN-LD, a low-power television station (channel 26, virtual 32) in Columbus, Ohio, United States
 World Championship Sports Network, an NBC Sports cable television network, now Universal Sports